The Mid-Plains League is a  collegiate summer baseball league comprising teams of the top college players from North America and beyond. Players are not paid, so as to maintain their college eligibility. Teams are run similarly to a professional minor league team, providing players an opportunity to play under the same conditions, using wooden bats and NCAA specification baseballs.

Teams play 36 games scheduled over a 44-day season running from early June to mid-July. The winner of the postseason playoffs will be named the Mid-Plains League champion and claim the Brett Cowdin Memorial Cup.

Teams

Historical standings

2014

2015

2019

2020

Champions

Awards

References

External links 

 Mid-Plains League website
Baldwin City Blues website
Junction City Brigade website
Midwest Athletics website
Topeka Golden Giants website
Sabetha Bravos website

Summer baseball leagues
College baseball leagues in the United States
2014 establishments in the United States
Sports leagues established in 2014
Sports in the Midwestern United States